The 1928 Portuguese presidential election was held on 25 March. Óscar Carmona ran unopposed.

Results

Notes and references

See also
 President of Portugal
 Portugal
 Politics of Portugal

1928
1928 elections in Europe
1928 elections in Portugal
March 1928 events